Omega Carinae, Latinized from ω Carinae, is a star in the constellation Carina. With a declination greater than 70 degrees south of the celestial equator, it is the most southerly of the bright stars of Carina (third-magnitude or brighter), and it is part of a southern asterism known as the Diamond Cross.

Properties
Omega Carinae has a stellar classification of B8 IIIe, which places it in the category of Be stars, that display emission lines of hydrogen their spectrum. Omega Carinae is a shell star, having a circumstellar disk of gas surrounding its equator. The luminosity class of III indicates it has evolved into a giant star, having exhausted the hydrogen at its core and left the main sequence.

The star's axis of rotation is inclined by an estimated angle of 70.8° to the line of sight from the Earth.

In the next 7500 years, the south Celestial pole will pass close to this star (AD 5800) and then I Carinae.

In culture

References

External links
Southern Sky Photos

Carinae, Omega
B-type giants
Carina (constellation)
050099
089080
4037
PD-69 1178
Be stars